David Laperrière (May 7, 1868 – May 18, 1932) was a Canadian provincial politician. He was the Liberal member of the Legislative Assembly of Quebec for Yamaska from 1923 to 1931. He was also mayor of Pierreville from 1914 to 1931.

References

1868 births
1932 deaths
Mayors of places in Quebec
People from Centre-du-Québec
Quebec Liberal Party MNAs